Emmeline Ragot (born 27 May 1986) is a French former professional downhill mountain biker. 

She was the world downhill champion in 2009 and 2011, in addition to two second place finishes and three third place finishes. Although she never won the general classification of the UCI Downhill World Cup, she finished second overall three times and third twice. Ragot was also a six time national champion, and won the four-cross and downhill events at the 2013 European Championships.

She announced her retirement from the sport on 22 August 2015 during the UCI World Cup, in order to focus on working as a physiotherapist.

References

External links

1986 births
Living people
French female cyclists
Downhill mountain bikers
People from Angoulême
French mountain bikers
UCI Mountain Bike World Champions (women)
Sportspeople from Charente
Cyclists from Nouvelle-Aquitaine